Churton Park is an affluent suburb 1.5 km north of Johnsonville in Wellington, the capital city of New Zealand. It was established in the 1970s.

The suburb includes Churton Park Reserve which includes a recreational sports field, two primary schools and a kindergarten. The Churton Park Community Centre, which is managed and staffed by Wellington City Council, is also located in the Village.

History

Churton Park is one of the youngest suburbs in Wellington and was farmland until 1970. 
In the 1850s Thomas Drake was running 200 sheep in what is now Churton Park.

The suburb was developed by "John Dick Walker" (1926-1981).

The area of Churton Park near current Lakewood Avenue was originally a swamp and has been recently developed into residential housing and a commercial shopping centre. Since being established, it is one of the fasted growing subdivisions in Wellington, with the population expected to grow to over 12,000 over the next two decades.

In 2018, Wellington City Council purchased the 268 Ohariu Valley Rd property adding much of the ridge line overlooking Churton Park (from Ohariu Valley Rd to west of the Erlestoke Cres cul-de-sac) to the Outer Green Belt

Geography

The topography is quite hilly and has regenerating bush in some areas that has not been excavated for housing sub-divisions. Steep hills extend west over to Ohariu Valley. Extensive cut and fill earthworks have been required in the construction of the subdivisions for housing.

Weather
The micro-climate is only slightly different from that of Johnsonville, but is warmer and less windy than Wellington due to being sheltered from the southerly winds that come from the Cook Strait. It rarely snows, but during winter 2011 snowfalls briefly shut down buses and closed roads, causing some students and workers to stay home for a few days.

Demographics

Churton Park had a population of 7,254 at the 2018 New Zealand census, an increase of 735 people (11.3%) since the 2013 census, and an increase of 1,401 people (23.9%) since the 2006 census. There were 2,409 households. There were 3,522 males and 3,735 females, giving a sex ratio of 0.94 males per female, with 1,587 people (21.9%) aged under 15 years, 1,218 (16.8%) aged 15 to 29, 3,696 (51.0%) aged 30 to 64, and 759 (10.5%) aged 65 or older.

Ethnicities were 59.2% European/Pākehā, 5.0% Māori, 2.4% Pacific peoples, 37.8% Asian, and 2.9% other ethnicities (totals add to more than 100% since people could identify with multiple ethnicities).

The proportion of people born overseas was 41.3%, compared with 27.1% nationally.

Although some people objected to giving their religion, 46.2% had no religion, 36.1% were Christian, 6.7% were Hindu, 1.8% were Muslim, 2.9% were Buddhist and 1.7% had other religions.

Of those at least 15 years old, 2,448 (43.2%) people had a bachelor or higher degree, and 408 (7.2%) people had no formal qualifications. The employment status of those at least 15 was that 3,222 (56.9%) people were employed full-time, 756 (13.3%) were part-time, and 180 (3.2%) were unemployed.

Education

School enrollment zones
Churton Park is within the enrollment zones for Onslow College, Newlands College, St Oran's College, Raroa Normal Intermediate Amesbury School, and Churton Park School.

Primary schools
Churton Park has two state primary schools that cater for pupils up to Year 6. Churton Park School on Churton Drive is an established school, and the roll has rapidly increased over the years. To accommodate these increases, there were many renovations to the buildings between 1997 and 2007. In 2006, to help manage roll growth, the School Board proposed an amendment to the zoning policy/area. This was heatedly debated in the community as the proposal would have removed several long-standing streets from the Zone.  The associated community concern, protest action and lobbying by the Campaign for Local Schooling and parent feedback resulted in the announcement by the Ministry of Education in 2007 that a new, larger, school site would be developed in the area.  On 17 March 2009, Minister of Education Anne Tolley announced that a second primary school would be built in the area instead.

Amesbury School on Amesbury Drive opened at the start of 2012. It has over 80 pupils and is growing. The Amesbury Hall at the school was opened in May by Wellington Mayor Celia Wade-Brown. The construction of the hall was funded in part by the proceeds from the sale of part of the school site (which was held as a Reserve) by WCC to the Ministry of Education.  The Amesbury Hall is available for community use.

Preschool
There is a little school on Melksham Drive off Westchester Drive and a kindergarten next to Churton Park School.

Mining
There are historic gold mining shafts in the area. Tawa Flats All Luck Gold Mining Company shafts of 1881 included one now buried beneath Erlestoke Crescent.

Public Transport
The suburb consists of two routes operated by Tranzurban. The Route 1 connects Churton Park to Johnsonville, the city centre, Newtown and Island Bay. The Route 19 acts as a Johnsonville loop. A separate service along Middleton Road connects Johnsonville to Tawa and Porirua.

A 2017 report said that a proposed commuter railway station near Churton Park on the Kapiti Line (and actually in Glenside) was too expensive.

References

External links
Churton Park information

Suburbs of Wellington City